Larry Creed Ford, Sr. (September 29, 1950 – March 2, 2000) was a biomedical researcher and gynaecologist from Irvine, California, United States who was suspected of conspiring to murder his business partner, James Patrick Riley and subsequently found to have stored lethal biological toxins in his home and office.

Death 
On February 28, 2000, Ford's business partner at Biofem, Inc., James Patrick Riley, was shot and wounded by a masked gunman at the company's office near the Irvine Spectrum. Police quickly discovered that the owner of the gunman's getaway van, Dino D'Saachs, made a phone call to Ford the morning of the attack.

Following police questioning on March 2, Ford committed suicide with a shotgun at his Woodbridge home. His suicide note claimed he was innocent of the attempted murder, but added that there was information hidden in the house of interest to the police. When authorities searched the home, they discovered containers buried next to his swimming pool containing assault rifles and C-4 plastic explosives. In refrigerator at his home, were 266 bottles and vials of pathogens.  Among them were the bacterial agents of Clostridium tetani and Clostridium difficile. According to the Orange County's Health Officer, the microorganisms were found in extremely poor condition. 

Some 83 files with medical records and personal items taken by Ford from his female patients were found as trophies hidden in the ground as well. Dr. Vikki Hufnagel who had been filing complaints about Ford to the California Medical Board CMB for years had been repeatedly threatened by Larry . Detective Victor Ray informed Vikki that a file existed in which Ford was planning to kill her. Hufnagel filed to the authorities and the CMB a formal complaint on 01/14/2013 to remove Ford's medical license and to fully investigate the 83 files as well as the cases of two women: Shane Gregory who was Ford's mistress until she became ill and Tami Tippit (a set stylist) who became ill after a single business lunch with Ford. Ford went on to brag to others how he had infected them with various diseases. Mike Wallace of 60 minutes interviewed these women in June of 2002 in a segment titled "Dr. Death". Ms. Tippit succumbed from her illness in June 2006. 

Ford was in the news years earlier when he was shot in the UCLA parking lot and saw his shooter. It was alleged that Ford was shot by the husband of a patient he was having an affair with at the time.

There is no evidence to suggest that these materials were being used to prepare a biological weapon, and neither of these bacteria are on the Center for Disease Control and Prevention (CDC) list of possible bioterrorism agents. 

Strikingly however, other official accounts circulated at the time of the evacuation and investigation, included finding anthrax on the property which is a threat to public health. Somehow, these accounts are no longer found in the OC Health Officer's report.

City officials closed an elementary school and evacuated 48 Woodbridge families (about 250 residents) in the immediate area while they performed a thorough search of Ford's home.

To this day the shooter of Mr. Riley has never been caught. With the death of Dr. Ford and no continued investigation little can be done to prove his connection to the shooting of Mr. Riley.

Alleged ties to South African biological warfare
After Ford killed himself, a number of newspapers alleged that he and Riley had corporate ties with biological warfare development in apartheid-era South Africa. Ford was also linked to Dr. Daniel Knobel, former chief medical officer for the South African  Defence Force.

Notes

References
 New York Times - California Doctor's Suicide Leaves Many Troubling Mysteries Unsolved
 60 Minutes - 'Dr. Death' And His Accomplice
 
 

1950 births
2000 suicides
Suicides by firearm in California